Hush Records is a Portland, Oregon based record label founded by Chad Crouch.

Background
Crouch, frontman of the band Blanket Music, organized Hush Records in 1997, when he self-released a solo record called Portland, Or. The following year, Crouch bought a CD burner and began recording and distributing music by Mike Johnson (Reclinerland), Jeff London, and Ben Barnett (Kind of Like Spitting) to record stores locally. It wasn't until the 1999 releases of Kaitlyn Ni Donovan's Songs for Three Days and a compilation called Flag that Hush had a national distributor.

50th release
The label continues to release several records a year, recently having reached its 50th release milestone with the appropriately titled 50-track compilation Mile.

Artists and releases
In June, 2009, Loch Lomond released their Trumpets for Paper Children EP through Hush Records. Tracks on the EP were sourced from two previous albums, Lament For Children released in 2006 and Paper The Walls which was released in 2007. A converted church in Portland called "The Funky Church" was the site where two new videos of the band, "Elephants and Little Girls" and "Witchy" were recorded by label founder Chad Crouch. Hosannas' were a group that caught the attention of Hush Records. Impressed by their sound, Hush signed them up and released a CD, Then & Now & Then in 2010.

Hush artists (past and present)

 Peter Broderick
 Amy Annelle
 Blanket Music
 Bobby Birdman
 Casey Dienel
 Dat'r
 The Decemberists
 Fancie
 Graves
 Jeff London
 Kind of Like Spitting
 Kaitlyn Ni Donovan
 Laura Gibson
 Loch Lomond
 Miki Howard
 Noise for Pretend
 Norfolk & Western
 Novi Split
 The Operacycle
 Parks and Recreation
 The Places
 Podington Bear
 Reclinerland
 Corrina Repp
 Shelley Short
 Esperanza Spalding
 Super XX Man
 The Tooth Fairy
 Velella Velella
 Run On Sentence
 Carlos Forster
 Kele Goodwin
 Chad Crouch
 Rauelsson
 Nick Jaina
YEYEY

See also
 List of record labels

References

External links
 Hush Records (official website)

American independent record labels
Record labels established in 1997
Indie rock record labels
Oregon record labels
Privately held companies based in Oregon
Companies based in Portland, Oregon
1997 establishments in Oregon